The ABU Asia-Pacific Robot Contest (ABU Robocon) is an Asian-Oceanian college robot competition, founded in 2002 by Asia-Pacific Broadcasting Union. In the competition robots compete to complete a task within a set period of time. The contest aims to create friendship among young people with similar interests who will lead their countries in the 21st century, as well as help advance engineering and broadcasting technologies in the region. The event is broadcast in many countries through ABU member broadcasters.

History and format 
ABU Robocon extended the concept from NHK Robocon which started in 1991 and restricted to teams from Japan only.

Each year the competition has different topics, but generally speaking, two or more robots must be used to complete the tasks. One of the robots would be manual control while the others are automatic. The best robots usually weight more than 10  kg and span in one square meter area. To build the robots, contestants, who are restricted to be undergraduate students, must possess rich knowledge in programming, mechanical design and electronic circuit design.

Each game is between two teams, often named red and blue. The playing field is symmetrical and robots from both teams start in the same condition (except for Robocon 2015 which employed a turn-based game based on badminton).

A typical game (except for Robocon 2015) lasts for three minutes but can end sooner if one team achieve a K.O victory which immediately finishes the game. In case that no teams achieve the K.O condition, the team that gets a higher score after three minutes will be declared a winner.

Earlier editions of Robocon tend to emphasize the competitiveness of the game, in which winners achieve their win by employing strategic approaches to deploy their robots as well as preventing their opponent from reaching the goal. For example, this strategy was notable in Vietnam's win in Robocon 2004 and 2006, and China's win in Robocon 2008. To mitigate the problems, later editions reduce the combat nature and put more emphasis on technology, designing and making the robot perform complicated maneuvers, which require teams to be more creative on designing robots.

Logos for Competition

Recent Competitions

ABU Robocon 2022 
ABU Robocon 2022 will be scheduled at Delhi, India and the game will be based on the game of lagori. In this game, two teams will design two robots, with each team will take turn playing as seeker and hitter. The seeker's first robot will first break the pile of stones using three small balls. Then the seeker's second robot will rebuild the pile of stones, but it also carries a ball on its head. The hitter's robot would attempt to throw their own balls to dislodge the ball on the seeker's head, and the round immediately ends once they succeeded. The team scores points based on the number of stones they displaced and then rebuilt, with the teams scoring more points declared the winner.

ABU Robocon 2021 
ABU Robocon 2021 was originally scheduled at Jimo, China and the game was based on the traditional game of East Asian countries pitch-pot, or throwing arrows to a pot. In this game, each team designs two robots. One robot can pick up arrows and throw them to the five pots located on the field, but is restricted to the outer area of the field. The other robot, in addition to throwing arrows from the outer area, can navigate through both the outer and inner area of the field, rotating pots, blocking throwing attempts of the opponent, or handing leftover arrows on the field to the first robot. Team scores point based on the number of arrows thrown into each pot, but if a team got the arrow to all five pots, they will achieve the K.O victory which immediately ends the game.

Due to the COVID-19 pandemic, the onsite contest was not held. The participants instead did a demonstration run of their robots at their local universities as a one-player game.

ABU Robocon 2020 
ABU Robocon 2020 was originally scheduled to host in Suva, Fiji and the game will be based on Fiji's national sport rugby. The theme is "ROBO RUGBY 7s", in this game, each team designs two robots, one as pass robot, and another as try robot. Each can either be manual or automated. The pass robot will pick up the rugby balls, and the try robot needs to either place them to the trying spot, or to kick the ball passing through a pole. Team scores points depending on the step and the zone location, but points can be awarded to the opponent's team if the kicking ball lands on the opponent's zone. The game ends when three minutes had passed, or when all seven kicking balls (shared for both teams) have been kicked.

Due to the COVID-19 pandemic, the contest, originally scheduled in August 2020, was postponed. An online event was instead scheduled in December 2020, where teams gave presentations of their robot design, and judges give out votes to select the winner. The University of Tokyo won the contest.

ABU Robocon 2019 
ABU Robocon 2019 was held at Ulaanbaatar, Mongolia on 25 August 2019. The theme was "Sharing the knowledge". It was related to the Urtuu system of Mongolian tradition. Total 17 teams from 16 different countries participated in this Competition. The Hong Kong, China team won the grand Prix, While Mongolia Team 1 was first runner up.

ABU Robocon 2018
The competition was held in Ninh Binh, Vietnam, in August 2018. The theme comes from a traditional game in ethnic region of Vietnam, namely ném còn (throwing shuttlecock). The goal of the game is to throw the shuttlecocks through the ring at height. In Vietnamese culture, the game is about celebration and making friendship.

In the game, each team are given a few shuttlecocks and needs to design two robots, one manual and one automatic robot. The manual robot needs to hand the shuttlecocks to the automatic robot, which attempts to throw the shuttlecocks through the rings (unlike the traditional game, there are three rings at various heights in this game). The winner can be achieved by points, or by immediate KO if the robots successfully throw the shuttlecocks through three rings, and for the highest ring, the shuttlecock lands on a golden disk on the opposite side. The winner of ABU Robocon 2018 is Lac Hong University coming from Vietnam.

ABU Robocon 2017
The ABU Robocon 2017 was held at Tokyo, Japan in the month of August. The theme was "Asobi: The landing disc". The theme revolves around the word "asobi" (play), which is also a fundamental philosophy behind Robocon. In "asobi," playful, unique, original show of skills is often more important than winning or losing, as everyone – friend and foe alike – can applaud and enjoy them.

So, in the "asobi" spirit: we encourage playful, unique, original robot designs and strategies!

In the match, each team will be given a set of discs which they are supposed to land on the poles of different height and at different distances. Team which will be able to land at least one disc on each pole will be declared as the winner of the game. If no team is able to land disc on each pole then the winner is declared as given in the rulebook. 
The winner of ABU Robocon 2017 is Lac Hong University coming from Vietnam.

ABU Robocon 2016 
The 2016 ABU Robocon was held at Bangkok, Thailand. The theme is "Clean Energy Recharging the World".
The concept behind the theme is the utilization of renewable energy sources, the theme is available at The match is between 2 teams (viz. red and blue), each team consisting of two robots. After a controversial final match (which required a replay), University of Technology (UTM), Malaysia won the International Robocon 2016.

ABU Robocon 2015 
The ABU Robocon 2015 was held in August in Yogyakarta, Indonesia. The contest theme was "Robominton-Badminton RoboGame". The venue for the contest was Sportorium of Universitas Muhammadiyah Yogyakarta (UMY). In the contest, the 2 teams (red and blue) had to play the game of badminton against each other. Each team made 2 robots to play a normal doubles badminton game.

Hung Yen University of Technology and Education, Vietnam won the International Robocon 2015 held in Yogyakarta, Indonesia.

ABU Robocon 2014 
The ABU Robocon 2014 was conducted on 24 August 2014 at Pune, India. The Theme for Robocon 2014 declared by India was "A Salute for Parenthood".The winner of ABU Robocon 2014 is LH-NVN, coming from Lac Hong University, Vietnam.

ABU Robocon 2013 
The ABU Robocon 2013 was held in Vietnam on 18 August 2013, where 19 Engineering teams from 18 countries participated. The Theme for Robocon 2013 declared by VTV was "The Green Planet".The winner of ABU Robocon 2013 is Kanazawa Institute of Technology coming from Japan.

ABU Robocon 2012 
The ABU Robocon 2012 was held in Hong Kong on 19 August 2012 where 17 Engineering teams from 16 countries or regions participated. The Theme for Robocon 2012 declared by Hong Kong was in Pursuit of Peace and Prosperity. The winner of the Robocon 2012 is University of Electronic Science and Technology of China.

ABU Robocon 2011 
The ABU Robocon 2011 was held in Bangkok, Thailand on 28 August 2011 where 19 Engineering Colleges from 18 countries participated. The Theme for Robocon2011 declared by Thailand was Krathong, Lighting Happiness with Friendship. 
The winner is Dhurakij Pundit University coming from Thailand.

ABU Robocon 2010 
The ABU Robocon2010 was held in Cairo, Egypt on 22 September 2010 where 18 Engineering Colleges from 17 countries participated. The Theme for Robocon 2010 declared by Egypt was Robo-Pharaohs Build Pyramids. 
It was won by University of Electronic Science and Technology of China to give China its 4th overwhelming win.

ABU Robocon 2009 
The ABU Robocon 2009 was held in Tokyo, Japan on 22 August 2009 with the Theme of Kago, the traditional Japanese palanquin, carried by human beings replaced by robots. The winners were a team from China who completed the task consistently in 18 seconds. 
It was won by Harbin Institute of Technology to give China its third successive win.

ABU Robocon 2008 
The ABU Robocon 2008 was held at Maharashtra Institute of Technology (MIT), Pune, India on 31 August 2008, where 17 Engineering Colleges from 16 countries participated. The Theme for Robocon 2008 declared by India was Govinda, a traditional Indian Deity who used to play earthly games by capturing Butter/Cheese from heads of Gopis.

Results

Winners of ABU Robocon

See also 
 Robocon India

References

External links 

 Official site

Robotics competitions
Recurring events established in 2002